Rublee is a surname. Notable people with this surname include:

 George Rublee (1868-1957), American lawyer
 Horace Rublee (1829–1896), American journalist and Ambassador 
 Juliet Barrett Rublee (1875-1966), American birth control advocate
William Alvah Rublee Ambassador and journalist